The following vessels were in commission, planned or under construction for HM Royal Navy in 1982. Many of these vessels took part in the 1982 Falklands War.

Aircraft Carriers
 – .

The carriers Hermes and Invincible were deployed to the Falkland Islands in April 1982 as the centre piece of Rear Admiral Woodward's Carrier Battle Group.

Destroyers
Type 82 – .
 – ,  & .

The destroyers Bristol, Sheffield, Coventry, Exeter, Cardiff, Glasgow, Antrim & Glamorgan were all present in the South Atlantic during the Falklands War.

Sheffield and Coventry were lost to enemy action, Sheffield by air launched Exocet missile and Coventry to bombs.  Glamorgan was struck by a modified air-launch Exocet from a land-based launcher causing extensive damage, however she was not crippled.

Frigates
Type 22 – Broadsword, Battleaxe, Brilliant & Brazen, Boxer, & Beaver + 2 planned.
Type 21 – Amazon, Antelope, Active, Ambuscade, Arrow, Alacrity, Ardent & Avenger.
 (Type 12I) –
Batch 1 (Ikara Group): Aurora, Euryalus, Galatea, Arethusa,  Naiad, Dido, Leander, & Ajax.
Batch 2 (Exocet Group): Cleopatra, Sirius, Phoebe, Minerva, Danae, Juno, Argonaut, & Penelope
Batch 3 (Broad-Beamed Group): Achilles, Diomede, Andromeda, Hermione, Jupiter, Apollo, Scylla, Ariadne, & Charybdis
 – Yarmouth, Lowestoft, Brighton, Rothesay, Londonderry, Falmouth, BerwickStand-by Squadron, Plymouth, & Rhyl.
 – Torquay & EastbourneHarbour training ship.
 Type 81 - Gurkha, Tartar & Zulu (all reactivated from reserve for Falklands War)

Ardent and Antelope lost due to enemy action.

Amphibious Units
 – Fearless & Intrepid.
 Royal Fleet Auxiliary: Sir Bedivere, Sir Galahad, Sir Geraint, Sir Lancelot, Sir Percivale & Sir Tristram.
 Logistic Landing Craft (RCT) – HMAV Ardennes & HMAV Arakan.
 LCM (9) Type – 14 craft
 LCM (7) Type – 2 craft
 Avon-class RPL – Avon, Bude, Clyde, Dart, Eden, Forth, Glen, Hamble, Itchen, Kennet, London & Medway.
 LCVP -
LCVP 1: 9 craft
LCVP 2: 8 craft
LCVP 3: 9 craft
 LCP(R) – 3 craft

Sir Galahad lost due to enemy action.

Mine Warfare Forces
.
  – Brecon, Ledbury, Cattistock, Cottesmore, Brocklesby, Middleton, Chiddingfold, Dulverton & Hurworth.
 .
  -
Mine Hunters: Bilderston, Brinton, Bossington, Gavinton, Hubberston, Iverston, Kedleston, Kellington, Kirkliston, Maxton, Nurton & Sheraton.
Minesweepers: Alfringston, Bickington, Crichton, Cuxton, Glasserton, Hodgeston, Laleston, Pollington, Shavington, Upton, Walkerton, Wotton, Soberton, Stubbington, Lewiston & Crofton.
  – St. David & Venturer.
  – Aveley.
  – Dittisham, Flintham & Thornham.

Ice Patrol Ship

Offshore Patrol Vessels

 Castle-class - Leeds Castle, Dumbarton Castle
 Island-class - Anglesey, Alderney, Jersey, Guernsey, Shetland, Orkney, Lindisfarne

Submarine Service
 - Resolution, Renown, Repulse, Revenge 
  - Five fitting out/in build as of December 1982
  - Swiftsure, Sovereign, Superb, Sceptre, Spartan, Splendid
 - Valiant, Warspite
 - Churchill, Conqueror, Courageous
 - Oberon, Ocelot, Odin, Olympus, Onslaught, Onyx, Opportune, Oppossum, Oracle, Orpheus, Osiris, Otter, Otis, 
Porpoise-class - Porpoise, Finwhale (harbour training vessel), Sealion, Walrus

See also
 List of Royal Navy vessels active in 1981

Notes
† - Royal Navy Reserve

References

Vessels active in 1982
1982